The Université d'Évry Val-d'Essonne (Université d'Évry Val-d'Essonne or UEVE) is a French public university located in Évry-Courcouronnes, Île-de-France, and is one of the founding members of Paris-Saclay University.

The UEVE is expected to merge with the Paris-Saclay University in 2025.

This university founded in 1991 (by Decree), is located in a “ville nouvelle” which is dynamic and constantly evolving. The city of Évry-Courcouronnes is home to many firms (Accor, Carrefour etc.), the largest mall in Île-de-France and a national theatre.

Just 25 minutes from Paris by RER, Évry is near the countryside. The Forest of Fontainebleau is only 21 miles (35 kilometres) away.

There are more than 160 curricula from two-year undergraduate degrees to the doctoral level, over half of which are professionally oriented. The university offers courses in Science, Technology, Law, Economics, Management and Social Sciences.

Today, the university counts more than 10,000 students (data from April 2008) in both initial and ongoing training and the university has built a reputation as a center of excellence.

Thanks to 18 laboratories and three doctoral schools, the university is also a significant research centre developing major projects, in particular, those concerning Biology in conjunction with the French National Sequencing Center (Genoscope).

The university is a member of UniverSud Paris, Cap Digital, Systematic Paris-Region, ASTech, Medicen, and Finance Innovation and an associate member of the University of Paris-Saclay.

Academics

Unité de Formation et de Recherche (UFR) 
The Savary Law of 1984 restructured academic departments in French universities. Each department was made into a UFR, "Unité de formation et de recherche" or Research and Formation Unit that offers both undergraduate and graduate programs. Each UFR of the university is governed by a director elected from the department and heads over a council of elected professors who control its curriculum.
 Law and Political Science
 Social Sciences of Management
 Management - Administration Economic and Social
 History
 Sociology
 Economy
 Languages, Arts and Music
 Arts - Music
 Applied Foreign Languages
 Fundamental and Applied Sciences
 Biology
 Chemistry
 Computer
 Mathematics
 Physical
 Science and Technology of Sports and Physical Activities
 Science and Technology
 Science and Technology
 Engineering Sciences

University Institute of Technology 
 Marketing Techniques
 Thermal Engineering and Energy
 Business Management and Administration
 Mechanical and Production Engineering
 Logistics and Transport Management
 Electrical Engineering and Computer Engineering
 Science and Engineering
 Quality, Industrial Logistics and Organisation

Doctoral Schools  
Nationally assessed laboratories and research teams support Doctoral Schools which are based on one or several fields of study.  In addition to high-level training in a discipline, the Doctoral Schools assist future doctors in the preparation of their careers by creating bridges between private enterprise and the economic environment.

 "Science and Engineering"
 "From Genomes to Organisms"
 "Economics, Management and Locale"

Research laboratories and units

Humanities and Society 
 Laboratory of Social and Economic History of Technology
 "Pierre Naville" Center
 Search Arts Entertainment Music (MSAR)
 "Leon Duguit" Center for the Study of the new law changes

Life Sciences 
 "Statistics and Genome" Laboratory
 Molecular Immunology and Innovative Biotherapies
 European Research Laboratory for Rheumatoid Arthritis
 Institute for Systems Biology and Synthetic (ISSB)
 Laboratory Structure - Activity of Normal and Pathological Biomolecules
 Metabolic Genomics
 Institute of Stem Cells for the Treatment and Study of Monogenic Diseases (I-STEM)
 Unit of Integrative Biology of adaptation to exercise
 Research Unit Plant Genomics (URGV)

Science and Technologies of Information and Communication 
 Computing, Integrative Biology and Complex Systems (IBISC)

Basic Sciences and Engineering 
 Analysis and Modeling Laboratory for Biology and Environment
 "Kastler Brossel" Laboratory
 Analysis and Probability
 Laboratory of Mechanics and Energetics of Évry

International relations 
The University of Évry has established links with many foreign universities. The agreements allow for exchanges of both students and professors. They concern the five continents.

Member of exchanges programmes : Erasmus (EU), MICEFA (USA) and CREPUQ (Quebec).

Notable 
 Professor Karine Saporta
 Professor Olivier Le Cour Grandmaison
 Professor Michel Caboche
 Professor Jérôme Glachant
 Professor Jean-Pierre Durand

Alumni 
 Cyprien Verseux, Astrobiologist

See also 

University of Paris-Saclay

References

External links
Official website 
Official website 
Bologna Process

 
Engineering universities and colleges in France
Schools of informatics
Educational institutions established in 1991
Universities in Île-de-France
1991 establishments in France
Education in Évry, Essonne